Kamal Thapa (born 20 September 1998) is a Nepali footballer who plays as a midfielder for Nepali club Pokhara Thunders and the Nepal national team.

References

External links
 

Living people
1998 births
Nepalese footballers
Nepal international footballers
Association football midfielders